Latanya Arvette Sweeney is an American computer scientist. She is the Daniel Paul Professor of the Practice of Government and Technology at the Harvard Kennedy School and in the Harvard Faculty of Arts and Sciences at Harvard University. She is the founder and director of the Public Interest Tech Lab, founded in 2021 with a $3 million grant from the Ford Foundation as well as the Data Privacy Lab. She is the current Faculty Dean in Currier House at Harvard.

Sweeney is the former Chief Technologist of the Federal Trade Commission and Editor-in-Chief of Technology Science. Her best known academic work is on the theory of k-anonymity, and she is credited with the observation that "87% of the U.S. population is uniquely identified by date of birth, gender, postal code".

Education 
Sweeney graduated from Dana Hall Schools in Wellesley, Massachusetts, receiving her high school diploma in 1977. She delivered the valedictory at the graduation ceremony.

She completed her undergraduate degree in computer science at the Harvard University Extension School. In 2001, Sweeney was awarded a Ph.D. in computer science from the Massachusetts Institute of Technology, the first African American woman to do so. She began her undergraduate work in computer science at MIT, but left to found a company.  Of this career move she has said, "I would do something that was really quite noteworthy, but there was nowhere to publish about it. You could get paid for it, but there was no way to say, 'You won’t believe what I just did!' The only way to get it was to go back to school."

Career 
In 2001, Sweeney founded the Data Privacy Lab at Carnegie Mellon University. She was a member of the Program Committee for Modeling Decisions for Artificial Intelligence in 2005. In 2004, she founded the Journal of Privacy Technology, later becoming the editor-in-chief in 2006. She is currently one of the faculty deans of Harvard's Currier House.  

In 1997, Sweeney conducted her first re-identification experiment wherein she successfully identified then Massachusetts governor, William Weld, to his medical records using publicly accessible records. Her results had a significant impact on privacy centered policymaking including the health privacy legislation HIPAA; however publication of the experiment was rejected twenty times. The several re-identification experiments she conducted after this were met with serious publication challenges as well. In fact, a court ruling in Southern Illinoisian v. Department of Public Health barred her from publication and sharing of her methods for a successful re-identification experiment. Fear of publicly exposing a serious issue with no known solution fueled the majority of the backlash against publication of her works and similar re-identification experiments for over a decade. Unless experiments concluded that no risk existed or that the issue could be resolved through reasonable technological advancement, publication was largely denied.

In her landmark article “Only You, Your Doctor, and Many Others May Know,” Sweeney discussed her research project in which she was able to locate and match identities and personal health records through a number of methods. Such methods, as she explains in depth later on, include looking at public health records from hospitals and newspaper stories. Towards the end of the article, Sweeney touches upon the different approaches of how she analyzed and matched the data, either through using computer programs or human effort. She then makes the conclusion that new and improved methods of data sharing are necessary.

Since 2011, Sweeney's Data Privacy Lab at Harvard has been conducting research about data privacy. It intends to provide a cross-disciplinary perspective about privacy in the process of disseminating data.

In 2021, Sweeney launched the Public Interest Technology Lab at Harvard's John F. Kennedy School of Government, housed in the Shorenstein Center on Media, Politics and Public Policy.

See also
Datafly algorithm
Data re-identification

References

External links

Further reading

American medical researchers
Privacy
Harvard Extension School alumni
Harvard University alumni
MIT School of Engineering alumni
Carnegie Mellon University faculty
Place of birth missing (living people)
Living people
Year of birth missing (living people)
American computer scientists
Artificial intelligence ethicists
African-American computer scientists
Federal Trade Commission personnel
Chief technology officers